Jann Simon Wenner (born January 7, 1946) is an American magazine magnate who is a co-founder of the popular culture magazine Rolling Stone, and former owner of Men's Journal magazine. He participated in the Free Speech Movement while attending the University of California, Berkeley. Wenner, with his mentor Ralph J. Gleason, co-founded Rolling Stone in 1967.

Later in his career, Wenner co-founded the Rock and Roll Hall of Fame and founded other publications. As a publisher and media figure, he has faced controversy regarding Hall of Fame eligibility favoritism, the breakdown of his relationship with gonzo journalist Hunter S. Thompson, and criticism that his magazine's reviews were biased.

Early life and career
Wenner was born in New York City, the son of Sim and Edward Wenner. He grew up in a secular Jewish family.

His parents divorced in 1958, and he and his sisters, Kate and Merlyn, were sent to boarding schools. He completed his secondary education at the Chadwick School in 1963 and went on to attend the University of California, Berkeley. Before dropping out of Berkeley in 1966, Wenner was active in the Free Speech Movement and produced the column "Something's Happening" in the student-run newspaper, The Daily Californian.

With the help of his mentor, San Francisco Chronicle jazz critic Ralph J. Gleason, Wenner landed a job at Ramparts, a high-circulation muckraker, where Gleason was a contributing editor and Wenner worked on the magazine's spinoff newspaper.

Media industry
In 1967, Wenner and Gleason founded Rolling Stone magazine in San Francisco. To get the magazine started, Wenner borrowed $7,500 from family members and from the family of his soon-to-be wife, Jane Schindelheim.

Throughout the 1970s and 1980s, Wenner played an integral role in popularizing writers such as Hunter S. Thompson, Ben Fong-Torres, Paul Nelson, Greil Marcus, Dave Marsh, Grover Lewis, Timothy Crouse, Timothy Ferris, Joe Klein, Cameron Crowe, Joe Eszterhas and P.J. O'Rourke. He also discovered photographer Annie Leibovitz when she was a 21-year-old San Francisco Art Institute student. Many of Wenner's proteges, such as Crowe, credit him with giving them their biggest breaks. Tom Wolfe recognized Wenner's influence in ensuring that his first novel, The Bonfire of the Vanities, was completed, stating "I was absolutely frozen with fright about getting it done and I decided to serialize it and the only editor crazy enough to do that was Jann."

In 1977, Rolling Stone shifted its base of operations from San Francisco to New York City.
The magazine's circulation dipped briefly in the late 1970s and early 1980s as Rolling Stone responded slowly in covering the emergence of punk rock and again in the 1990s, when it lost ground to Spin and Blender in coverage of hip hop. Wenner hired former FHM editor Ed Needham, who was then replaced by Will Dana, to turn his flagship magazine around, and by 2006, Rolling Stones circulation was at an all-time high of 1.5 million copies sold every fortnight. In May 2006, Rolling Stone published its 1000th edition with a holographic, 3-D cover modeled on The Beatles' Sgt. Pepper's Lonely Hearts Club Band album cover.

Wenner has been involved in the conducting and writing of many of the magazine's Rolling Stone Interviews. His interview subjects have included: Bill Clinton, Al Gore, John Kerry, and Barack Obama for the magazine during their election campaigns and in November 2005 had an interview with U2 rockstar Bono, which focused on music and politics. Wenner's interview with Bono received a National Magazine Award nomination.

Rolling Stone and Wenner are chronicled in three books, Gone Crazy and Back Again by Robert Sam Anson, Rolling Stone: The Uncensored History, and Sticky Fingers:The Life and Times of Jann Wenner and Rolling Stone Magazine by Joe Hagan. Former Rolling Stone journalist David Weir is working on a biography, as is poet and Beat historian Lewis MacAdams. Robin Green's memoir The Only Girl covers the time she worked at Rolling Stone.

Wenner founded the magazine Outside in 1977; wherein William Randolph Hearst III and Jack Ford both worked for the magazine before Wenner sold it a year later. He also briefly managed the magazine Look and, in 1993, started the magazine Family Life. In 1985, he bought a share in Us Weekly, followed by a joint purchase of the magazine with The Walt Disney Company the following year. The magazine made the transition from a monthly to a weekly in 2000. In August 2006, Wenner bought out Disney's share to consolidate 100% ownership.

From 2004 to 2006, Wenner contributed approximately $63,000 to Democratic candidates and liberal organizations.

In September 2016, Advertising Age reported that Wenner was in the process of selling a 49% stake in Rolling Stone to Singaporean company BandLab Technologies. The new investor would have no direct involvement in the editorial content of the magazine. In October 2016, Wenner started publishing Glixel, a video games-based website.

In September 2017, Wenner Media announced that the remaining 51% of Rolling Stone was up for sale. That share was bought by Penske Media Corporation, who later acquired the remaining stake from BandLab.

In 2022, Little, Brown and Company published Wenner's memoir, Like a Rolling Stone.

Controversy

Rock and Roll Hall of Fame
Wenner, who was made a member of the Rock and Roll Hall of Fame Foundation in 1983, has endured controversy during his career as it relates to his involvement in the organization. Fans and supporters of several artists have placed a large amount of blame on Wenner for keeping them out of the Hall of Fame. They claim Wenner has lobbied to keep them from consideration and nomination to the Hall based on personal bias and a dislike for their music. One hit wonders have been elected to the Hall of Fame while bands with multiple decades of chart success (Styx, Foreigner, Boston, REO Speedwagon, etc.) remain excluded.

In June 2007, Monkees bassist Peter Tork alleged to the New York Post that Wenner is excluding the group:

Hunter S. Thompson
Hunter S. Thompson was to provide Rolling Stone coverage for the 1976 presidential campaign that would appear in a book published by the magazine. Reportedly, as Thompson was waiting for a $75,000 advance check to arrive, he learned that Wenner canceled the endeavor without telling him.

Wenner then asked Thompson to travel to Vietnam to report on what appeared to be the closing of the Vietnam War. Thompson accepted and arrived with the country in chaos, just as the United States was preparing to evacuate and other journalists were scrambling to find transportation out of the region. While there, Thompson learned that Wenner had canceled this excursion as well, and Thompson found himself in Vietnam without health insurance or additional financial support. Thompson's story about the fall of Saigon would not be published in Rolling Stone until ten years later.

These two incidents severely strained the relationship between the author and the magazine, and Thompson contributed far less to the publication in later years.

Hootie and the Blowfish review
Wenner fired rock critic Jim DeRogatis in 1996 after DeRogatis published a negative review for an album by the then-popular band Hootie and the Blowfish. Wenner pulled DeRogatis' review from the magazine. Asked by the New York Observer if Wenner was a fan of Hootie and the Blowfish, DeRogatis responded that Wenner "is a fan of any band that sells eight million records." Wenner fired DeRogatis the next day.

Sticky Fingers

In June 2017, Wenner cut ties with Joe Hagan, the biographer he had commissioned to write his biography, Sticky Fingers, calling the book Hagan produced "deeply flawed and tawdry, rather than substantial". Hagan had been working closely with Wenner on the book since 2013, and Sticky Fingers was released in October 2017.

Personal life
In the summer of 1967, after Rolling Stone started, Wenner and Jane Schindelheim were married in a small Jewish ceremony. Wenner and his wife separated in 1995, though Jane Wenner still remains a vice president of Wenner Media. She and Wenner have three sons, Alexander Jann, Theodore "Theo" Simon, and Edward Augustus, known as Gus,  head of Wenner Media's digital operations.

Since 1995, Wenner's domestic partner has been Matt Nye, a fashion designer. Together, Wenner and Nye have three children born via surrogate mothers, Noah and twins Jude and India Rose.

Awards and honors
2010: Norman Mailer Prize, Lifetime Achievement in Magazine Publishing

Notes
Working with a small group of distinguished record company heads and music industry professionals, Wenner co-founded the Rock and Roll Hall of Fame Foundation in 1983.
Wenner produced Boz Scaggs's self-titled major label debut album in 1969.
Wenner made a guest "appearance" in the Marvel Comic Daredevil issue 100 in 1973, in which he interviews the superhero, who is thereby motivated to remember his origins (which he shares with the readers of the comic, but not with Wenner.)
In 1985, he produced and appeared as himself in the movie Perfect with Jamie Lee Curtis and John Travolta. He also had cameo roles in Cameron Crowe's films Jerry Maguire and Almost Famous.
In 1985, Wenner had a Rolling Stone cover photograph of Don Johnson digitally edited to remove the handgun and holster from the Miami Vice star because of Wenner's opposition to handguns.
The American Society of Magazine Editors inducted Wenner into their Hall of Fame in 1997, making him the youngest editor ever inducted.
Amy Ray lambasted Wenner as "Rolling Stones most fearless leader" in her song "Lucystoners" from her 2001 solo debut Stag, accusing him of discriminating against women artists in favor of a "boys' club of rock."  
In 2004, Wenner was inducted into the Rock and Roll Hall of Fame in the Lifetime Achievement category.
In the fall of 2007, Wenner published an oral biography of Hunter S. Thompson titled Gonzo: The Life of Hunter S. Thompson. Co-written with Corey Seymour, this work traces the life of Thompson as told through the stories of those closest to him.
In March 2014, it was announced that the publisher Knopf had acquired a biography of Wenner by journalist Joe Hagan for a seven-figure price. It was published in 2017 to mark the 50th anniversary of Rolling Stone.

Select Rolling Stone Interview bibliography

 Bob Dylan, May 3, 2007
 Bono, November 3, 2005
 John Kerry, November 11, 2004
 Al Gore, November 9, 2000
 Mick Jagger, December 14, 1995
 Bill Clinton, December 9, 1993
 Jerry Garcia, January 20, 1972
 John Lennon, January 21, 1971
 Bob Dylan, November 29, 1969
 Pete Townshend, September 28, 1968

See also
 Digital media
 LGBT culture in New York City
 List of LGBT people from New York City
 New Yorkers in journalism
 Publishing Triangle

References

External links 
 
 Official website
 How I Built This - Rolling Stone: Jann Wenner (audio interview)

1947 births
Activists from New York City
American magazine editors
American magazine founders
American magazine publishers (people)
American mass media owners
American publishing chief executives
Bisexual men
Businesspeople from New York City
Free speech activists
Jewish American writers
LGBT Jews
LGBT people from New York (state)
Living people
Rolling Stone people
University of California, Berkeley alumni
21st-century American Jews
American bisexual writers